Gamanthus is a genus of flowering plants belonging to the family Amaranthaceae.

Its native range is Caucasus to Pakistan.

Species
Species:

Gamanthus commixtus 
Gamanthus ferganicus 
Gamanthus gamocarpus 
Gamanthus leucophysus 
Gamanthus pilosus

References

Amaranthaceae
Amaranthaceae genera
Taxa named by Alexander von Bunge